The Wilmington Historic District is a national historic district located at Wilmington, New Hanover County, North Carolina. The district encompasses 875 contributing buildings 38 contributing sites, and 3 contributing structures in the historic core and surrounding residential sections of Wilmington.  The district developed after Wilmington was laid out in 1737, and includes notable examples of Queen Anne and Bungalow / American Craftsman style architecture.  Located in the district are the separately listed City Hall/Thalian Hall and Alton Lennon Federal Building and Courthouse.  Other notable buildings include:
 Smith-Anderson House (c. 1745)
 St. John's Masonic Lodge (1803)
 Burgwin-Wright House and Gardens (1771)
 DuBois-Boatwright House
 George Cameron House (c. 1800)
 DeRosset House (c. 1845)
 Bellamy Mansion (1859)
 Edward Latimer House (1882)
 Burrus House (1880s)
 McKoy House (1887)
 Victoria Theatre (1915)
 Cape Fear Hotel (1923-1925)
 St. James Episcopal Church (begun 1839) designed by Thomas U. Walter
 St. Thomas Roman Catholic Church (1846)
 First Baptist Church (1859-1870) designed by Samuel Sloan
 Temple of Israel (1875)
 New Hanover County Courthouse (1892)
 St. Mary's Catholic Church (1912).

It was listed on the National Register of Historic Places in 1974, with a boundary increase in 2003.

Gallery

References

Historic districts on the National Register of Historic Places in North Carolina
Queen Anne architecture in North Carolina
Buildings and structures in Wilmington, North Carolina
National Register of Historic Places in New Hanover County, North Carolina